Most sources agree that John D. Rockefeller (d. 1937) was the richest American in history, having amassed a wealth of more than $41 billion adjusted to 2022.

There are various methods of comparing individuals' wealth across time, including using simple inflation-adjusted totals or calculating an individual's wealth as a share of contemporary gross domestic product (GDP). For example, economic blogger Scott Sumner noted in 2018 that Rockefeller was worth $1.4 billion when he died in 1937, which was about $24 billion in dollars adjusted to 2018. Meanwhile, Bill Gates in 1999 was worth nearly $150 billion in dollars adjusted to 2018.

The second-richest person in terms of wealth vs. contemporary GDP is disputed. Most sources list Andrew Carnegie, but others say Gates, Cornelius Vanderbilt I, John Jacob Astor IV, or Henry Ford. Lower ranks are a matter of even bigger debate.

Vanderbilt left a fortune worth $100 million upon his death in 1870 ($ today).

As the United States became the foremost economic power in the world by the late 19th century, the wealthiest men in America were often also the wealthiest men in the world.

Fortune's Wealthiest Americans (1957)

In 1957, Fortune magazine developed a list of the seventy-six wealthiest Americans, which was republished in many American newspapers. Jean Paul Getty, when asked his reaction on being named wealthiest American and whether he was really worth a billion dollars, said "You know, if you can count your money, you don't have a billion dollars" and then added, "But remember, a billion dollars isn't worth what it used to be."

The second category, covering the second to eighth richest individuals, included Andrew Mellon's son, daughter, niece, and nephew. Wealthiest Americans included a total of seven members of the Rockefeller family, five members of the Ford family, four members of the Du Pont family (and a non-family DuPont executive), and four General Motors executives.

$400,000,000 to $700,000,000
Ailsa Mellon Bruce, New York, New York; inherited wealth: Mellon Bank, Gulf Oil Company, Alcoa.
Arthur Vining Davis, Miami, Florida; Alcoa, Florida real estate.
H. L. Hunt, Dallas, Texas; independent oil operator. 
Paul Mellon, Upperville, Virginia; inherited wealth.
Richard King Mellon, Pittsburgh, Pennsylvania; inherited wealth: Alcoa, Gulf Oil, Mellon Bank, etc.
John D. Rockefeller Jr., New York; inherited wealth: Standard Oil Trust.
Sarah Mellon, Pittsburgh; inherited wealth.

$200,000,000 to $400,000,000
Irénée du Pont, Wilmington, Delaware and Cuba; inherited wealth: E. I du Pont de Nemours & Co.
William du Pont Jr., Wilmington; inherited wealth: E. I du Pont de Nemours & Co.
Mrs. Frederick Guest, the former Amy Phipps, Palm Beach, Florida; inherited wealth from father Henry Phipps Jr., a Carnegie Steel executive.
Howard Hughes, Los Angeles; inherited wealth: Hughes Tool Company. 
Joseph P. Kennedy, Boston, Massachusetts and New York; real estate.
Daniel K. Ludwig, New York; National Bulk Carriers. 
Sid Richardson, Fort Worth, Texas; independent Oil operator.
Alfred P. Sloan, Jr., New York; General Motors Corporation.

$100,000,000 to $200,000,000
James Abercrombie, Houston, Texas; independent oil operator.
Vincent Astor, New York; inherited wealth: real estate.
Stephen Bechtel, San Francisco; construction, Bechtel Corporation.
William Blakley, Dallas; Braniff Airways, real estate. 
Jacob Blaustein, Baltimore, Maryland; American Oil Company.
Lammot du Pont Copeland, Wilmington; E. I du Pont de Nemours & Co.
Clarence Dillon, New York; Dillon, Read & Co.
Doris Duke, New York and New Jersey; inherited wealth: tobacco.
Mrs. Alfred I. du Pont, Jacksonville, Florida and Wilmington; inherited wealth: St. Joe Paper Company, E. I du Pont de Nemours & Co.
Mrs. Edsel Ford, Detroit, Michigan; inherited wealth: Ford Motor Company.
Amory Houghton, Ambassador to France; inherited wealth: Corning Glass.
Arthur A. Houghton Jr., New York; Corning Glass. 
Roy Arthur Hunt, Pittsburgh; Alcoa.
William Keck, Los Angeles; Superior Oil. 
Charles F. Kettering, Dayton, Ohio; General Motors Corporation.
Mrs. Jean Mauzé, the former Abby Rockefeller, New York; inherited wealth: Standard Oil Trust.
Mrs. Chauncey McCormick, the former Marion Deering, Chicago, Illinois; inherited wealth.
William L. McKnight, St. Paul, Minnesota; Minnesota Mining & Manufacturing.
John W. Mecom Sr., Houston; independent oil operator. 
Clint Murchison, Dallas; independent oil operator. 
Mrs. Charles Payson, the former Joan Whitney, New York; inherited wealth.
John L. Pratt, Fredericksburg, Virginia; General Motors Corporation. 
David Rockefeller, New York; Chase Manhattan Bank and inherited wealth: Standard Oil Trust.
John D. Rockefeller 3d, New York; inherited wealth: Standard Oil Trust.
Laurance Rockefeller, New York; venture capital: Eastern Air Lines, Reaction Motors, International Nickel and inherited wealth: Standard Oil Trust.
Nelson Rockefeller, New York; Rockefeller Center,-, Inc., International Basic Economy Corporation and inherited wealth: Standard Oil Trust.
Winthrop Rockefeller, Arkansas; ranching, Ibec Housing and inherited wealth: Standard Oil Trust.
R. E. Smith, Houston; independent oil operator. 
John Hay Whitney, New York, Ambassador to Britain; venture capital and inherited wealth.

$75,000,000 to $100,000,000
Michael Late Benedum, Pittsburgh and West Virginia; Benedum-Trees Oil Company, Hiawatha Oil and Gas, etc. 
Donaldson Brown, Port Deposit, Maryland; E. I du Pont de Nemours & Co.
George R. Brown, Houston; Brown & Root, Inc.
Herman Brown, Houston; Brown & Root, Inc.
John Nicholas Brown I, Newport, Rhode Island; inherited wealth: real estate. 
Godfrey L. Cabot, Boston; Godfrey L. Cabot, Inc., etc.
James A. Chapman, Tulsa, Oklahoma; inherited: wealth: oil.
Leo Corrigan, Dallas; real estate.
Mrs. Horace Dodge, Jr., Palm Beach and Detroit; inherited wealth: automobiles.
John T. Dorrance, Jr., Philadelphia, Pennsylvania; inherited wealth: Campbell Soup Company.
Benson Ford, Detroit; inherited wealth: Ford Motor Company. 
Henry Ford II, Detroit; inherited wealth: Ford Motor Company. 
William C. Ford, Detroit; inherited wealth: Ford Motor Company.
Erle P. Halliburton, Duncan, Oklahoma; Halliburton Oil Well Cementing Company (died in Los Angeles Oct. 13, 1957). 
Averell Harriman, Albany, New York, Governor of New York; inherited wealth: investment banking.
Henry J. Kaiser, Oakland, California; Kaiser Industries, etc.
John W. Kieckhefer, Milwaukee, Wisconsin and Prescott, Arizona; Kieckhefer Container, Eddy Paper (absorbed by Weyerhaeuser).
Robert Kleberg Jr., King Ranch, Texas; inherited wealth: cattle, oil, land. 
John E. Mabee, Tulsa; independent oil operator.
John D. MacArthur, Chicago; Bankers Life and Casualty Company.
A. H. Meadows, Dallas; General American Oil.
Charles S. Mott, Flint, Michigan; General Motors Corporation.
John M. Olin, Alton, Illinois; inherited wealth: Olin Mathieson Chemical. 
Spencer T. Olin, Alton, Ill.; inherited wealth: Olin Mathieson Chemical. 
J. Howard Pew, Philadelphia; inherited wealth: Sun Oil Company.
Joseph Pew, Philadelphia; inherited wealth: Sun Oil.
Marjorie Merriweather Post, Washington, DC; inherited wealth: General Foods.
James Sottile Jr., Miami; Pan American Bank. 
George W. Strake, Houston; inherited wealth: independent oil operator. 
Louis Wolfson, Miami Beach, Florida; Merritt-Chapman & Scott, New York Shipbuilding, etc.
Robert Woodruff, Atlanta, Georgia; The Coca-Cola Company.

Klepper & Gunther (1996)
In the 1996 book The Wealthy 100, authors Michael Klepper and Robert Gunther placed John D. Rockefeller atop the list of the richest Americans in history, followed by Cornelius Vanderbilt and John Jacob Astor. Bill Gates was the top living person, coming in fifth.

American Heritage (1998)
American Heritage magazine published the following list of 40 richest Americans ever in 1998, subtitling it "Surprise: Only three of them are alive today".

John D. Rockefeller
Andrew Carnegie
Cornelius Vanderbilt
John Jacob Astor
Bill Gates
Stephen Girard
Alexander Turney Stewart
Frederick Weyerhauser
Jay Gould
Marshall Field
Sam Walton
Henry Ford
Warren Buffett
Andrew W. Mellon
Richard B. Mellon
James Graham Fair
William Weightman
Moses Taylor
Russell Sage
John Insley Blair
Cyrus H. K. Curtis
Paul Allen
J. P. Morgan
E. H. Harriman
Henry Huddleston Rogers
Oliver Hazard Payne
Henry Clay Frick
Collis Potter Huntington
Peter Arrell Browne Widener
Nicholas Longworth
Philip Danforth Armour
James Clair Flood
Mark Hopkins Jr.
Edward Cabot Clark
Leland Stanford
Hetty Green
James J. Hill
William Rockefeller
Elias Hasket Derby
Claus Spreckels

Bernstein & Swan (2008)
Bernstein and Swan in All the Money in the World (2008) mention the 15 richest Americans of all time.

 John D. Rockefeller
 Andrew Carnegie
 Cornelius Vanderbilt
 John Jacob Astor
 Stephen Girard
 Richard B. Mellon
 A. T. Stewart
 Frederick Weyerhäuser
 Marshall Field
 Sam Walton
 Jay Gould
 Henry Ford
 Bill Gates
 Andrew W. Mellon
 Warren Buffett

Business Insider (2011)
Business Insider agreed on Rockefeller in first, but placed Andrew Carnegie second, followed by Vanderbilt, and Gates.

 John D. Rockefeller
 Andrew Carnegie
 Cornelius Vanderbilt
 Bill Gates
 John Jacob Astor
 Stephen Girard
 A. T. Stewart
 Frederick Weyerhäuser
 Jay Gould
 Stephen Van Rensselaer
 Marshall Field
 Sam Walton
 Warren Buffett

CNN Money (2014)
The following is a list compiled by CNN Money in 2014.

 John D. Rockefeller
 Cornelius Vanderbilt
 John Jacob Astor
 Stephen Girard
 Richard Mellon
 Andrew Carnegie
 Stephen Van Rensselaer
 A. T. Stewart
 Frederick Weyerhäuser
 Jay Gould
 Marshall Field
 Bill Gates
 Henry Ford
 Warren Buffett
 Andrew Mellon
 Sam Walton
 Moses Taylor
 Russell Sage
 James G. Fair 
 William Weightman

Current richest American
Elon Musk is presently the richest American, with an estimated net worth of $174.6 billion, as of December 15, 2022 (Musk also holds Canadian and South African citizenship).

By half decade
This list names the richest American by half decade starting in 1770.

References

Americans in history

Richest
Richest Americans